Vorwerk & Co. KG, trading as Vorwerk, is an international diversified corporate group headquartered in Wuppertal, Germany. Vorwerk was founded in 1883. The main business is the direct distribution of various products like household appliances such as Thermomix, a kitchen appliance, and Kobold vacuum cleaners, fitted kitchens and cosmetics.

The company, which is family-owned and operated as a limited partnership, reported having 12,000 full-time employees and over 590,000 self-employed sales representatives in more than 70 countries worldwide as of 2014. The largest proportion of sales representatives (546,000) work for the US-based subsidiary JAFRA Cosmetics. The company posted revenue of €2.8 billion in 2014.

History

The beginnings  Barmer Teppichfabrik Vorwerk & Co 
In 1883, the Barmer Teppichfabrik Vorwerk & Co was founded by the brothers Carl (1847–1907) and Adolf Vorwerk. That very same year, the brothers parted ways again and Carl Vorwerk continued to run the company. The firm initially manufactured high-quality carpets and upholstery fabrics, and later also the looms used to make them – first under an English patent, and then under an improved proprietary patent.

Carl Vorwerk’s son, Carl Jr. (1878–1904), was to be his successor as company director, but he died just a few months after taking the helm in 1903. Thus, upon the death of the company founder in 1907, his son-in-law, August Mittelsten Scheid (1871–1955), became sole managing partner. Under his leadership, the company diversified following the First World War, taking up the production of gear units and electric motors for gramophones as its military research efforts halted.

Kobold and direct sales 

As radio grew in popularity in the 1920s, gramophone sales dropped precipitously. This dire situation gave rise to the birth of the “Vorwerk Kobold” in 1929: chief engineer Engelbert Gorissen developed out of a gramophone motor a high-performance electric upright vacuum cleaner. On 25 May 1930, a patent was granted for the Kobold “Model 30”. At first, sales of what was at the time a completely unknown appliance in Germany were very poor, despite the relatively modest price of 20 Reichsmarks. Only when direct sales were launched in 1930 – the brainchild of Werner Mittelsten Scheid (19041953), a son of the company founder – did the product meet with success. By 1935, 100,000 “Kobolds” had been sold, by 1937 half a million and by 1953 one million. Already before the Second World War, in 1938, the first foreign sales organization was established: Vorwerk Folletto in Italy.

During World War II, the main plant in Wuppertal-Barmen was severely damaged in a May 1943 bombing, after which August Mittelsten Scheid’s sons, Werner and Erich Mittelsten Scheid, jointly took over management of the firm. The sales organization, which had held the company above water during the war years by selling various products, discontinued operations that year.

After the war was over, production and sales were rebuilt, first in Germany, and then in Europe and overseas. By 1955, 2,000 Vorwerk sales representatives were once again underway. Sole managing partner – following the death of his brother in 1953 – was Erich Mittelsten Scheid.

Further diversification 
In 1969, Dr. Jörg Mittelsten Scheid, Werner’s son, succeeded his uncle as head of the family business. Three years later, Günter Busch and Bernd Balders became the first managing partners who were not members of the founding family.

While up to the end of the 1960s the company focused mainly on the production and sale of vacuum cleaners, carpets and upholstery fabrics, ever since that time it has continually diversified, initially into the services sector. Vorwerk was co-founder of the akf bank in 1968; in 1970 the in-house data processing department brought forth the ZEDA Gesellschaft für Datenverarbeitung und EDV-Beratung mbH & Co. KG; and the founding of Hygienic Service Gebäudereinigung und Umweltpflege GmbH in 1974 was the germ cell that led to the Hectas Facility Services division. At the same time, the company was also expanding its range of household products. This included the launch of the Thermomix food processor in 1971, followed by Vorwerk Fitted Kitchens in 1974.

The company kicked off the 21st century with a number of new acquisitions and restructuring projects. In 2001, Vorwerk purchased the Lux Asia Pacific direct sales organization from the Swedish Electrolux group, thus consolidating its position on the Asian market. The next year saw the introduction of the “Feelina” ironing system, and the year after that the spin-off of the company’s data processing services: ZEDA was sold to T-Systems in 2003. The final coup was the acquisition of American cosmetic manufacturer Jafra Cosmetics in May 2004.

At the end of 2005, Jörg Mittelsten Scheid left the board. Since January 2013, corporate management at Vorwerk has been in the hands of: Walter Muyres (Managing Partner), Reiner Strecker (Managing Partner) and Frank van Oers (Managing Partner).

In 2017, Vorwerk acquired robotic vacuum manufacturer Neato Robotics.

Company overview

Company structure 
The consolidated Vorwerk group encompasses over 27 companies worldwide, which are divided into eight main fields of business.

Main fields of business 
 InDirect sales 
Division Kobold 
Division Thermomix (multifunctional kitchen appliance)
Division Jafra Cosmetics (cosmetics, skin and body care products)
Division Lux Asia Pacific (household appliances in the Asia-Pacific region)
 Division Vorwerk Carpets	
 Division Vorwerk Facility Management Holding KG (infrastructural facility services) 
 Division akf group (financial services)

Important companies and locations

Vorwerk 
Vorwerk & Co. KG, Wuppertal (Holding)
as well as sales companies in Germany, Austria, Italy, France, Spain, Czech Republic, Poland, Russia, Portugal, China, Taiwan, Mexico, Japan, Switzerland, Netherlands, Belgium, Luxembourg, Hungary, United States of America, Brazil, Dominican Republic, India, Indonesia, Thailand, Philippines, Vietnam, Singapore, Malaysia.

Vorwerk production sites 
Vorwerk Elektrowerke GmbH & Co. KG, Wuppertal (research of household appliances) 
Vorwerk Semco S.A.S., Cloyes-sur-le-Loir, France (Thermomix production) 
Vorwerk Folletto Manufacturing S.r.l., Arcore - Milan, Italy (production of accessories and ironing system) 
Vorwerk Household Appliances Co., Inc. Shanghai, China (production and sales)

Jafra 
JAFRA Cosmetics International, Inc., Westlake Village, California, USA (headquarters, research and development) 
Cosmeticos y Fragancias S.A. de C.V. Naucalpan de Juárez, Mexico (production) 
as well as additional sales companies in Mexico,  Germany, Switzerland, Austria, Italy, Netherlands, Brazil, Indonesia

Lux Asia Pacific 
Lux Asia Pacific Pte. Ltd., Singapore (headquarters) 
Lux Manufacturing Corp., Makati City, Philippines (water filter production) 
as well as additional sales companies in Japan, Indonesia, Thailand, Taiwan, Australia, Vietnam, Malaysia.

Vorwerk Carpets 
 Vorwerk & Co. Teppichwerke GmbH & Co. KG, Hamelin

Vorwerk Facility Management 
 Vorwerk Facility Management Holding KG, Wuppertal 
as well as additional subsidiaries in Germany, Austria, Netherlands, Czech Republic, Poland, Belgium, Greece

akf 
akf bank GmbH & Co. KG, Wuppertal  
as well as additional subsidiaries in Spain

Neato Robotics 

Neato Robotics was acquired by Vorwerk in 2017. Neato Robotics is now an independent subsidiary located in San Jose, California. The company is known for its line of robotic vacuum cleaners.

As of 2020, the company had approximately 130 employees.

History
Neato was founded in Newark, California in 2005 by Stanford alumni Joe Augenbraun, Linda Pouliot and JB Gomez through Stanford's annual Entrepreneur Challenge.

In February 2010, the company released its first product, the XV-11 robotic vacuum cleaner.

In 2011, an enhanced version of its robotic vacuum cleaner was developed under contract for German appliance maker Vorwerk's Kobold subsidiary and distributed in Germany as the Vorwerk VR-100. In June, the company released the XV-15, a European version of the XV-11. In October, the company produced a white version of the XV-15 called SV-12.

In 2012, Neato Robotics released the Neato XV-21, incorporating some features previously available on the Vorwerk Kobold. 

In 2013, venture capitalist and former Logitech co-founder Giacomo Marini was named company CEO.  In March, the company announced new black models Signature XV and Signature Pro, with increased extraction power.

In March 2014, Neato Robotics released an expanded model series named Botvac. This model incorporated a rotating side brush previously available only on the Vorwerk Kobold models in Germany.

In May 2015, the company released its more powerful Botvac D series. In September, the company released its Botvac Connected cleaner, the first robotic vacuum to feature Wi-Fi. The Connected series also replaced the NiMh battery with a lithium ion, and added a phone app. 

In November 2016, the company integrated Amazon Alexa voice control technology with its Botvac Connected vacuum. 

In September 2017, the company was purchased by German appliance manufacturer Vorwerk, but continued to operate as an independent subsidiary.

Robot vacuums 
Neato robot vacuums are known for their D shape, which allows them to vacuum corners.

Neato robot vacuums travel in straight lines instead of a random pattern. The robots utilize a laser range finder that scan their surroundings in a full 360° circle, and its SLAM algorithm allow robots to map the room being vacuumed. Its vacuums were reportedly the first to use LiDAR, to enable photographic mapping of rooms, and allowing operation in darkness.

The Neato robot returns to its charging base when the battery is low, and it has sensors that prevent it from falling off stairs. In case the robot is used in a floorplan larger than it can cover with one battery charge, the robot is able to continue cleaning from where it left off the previous session, after recharging its batteries.

The company's Botvac Connected series includes Amazon Alexa, Google Assistant and IFTTT technology, supporting voice controls. Its newer vacuums can be controlled using a downloadable smartphone app. The features of Neato robot vacuums can be upgraded by owners by changing the firmware, using a USB connector or wirelessly, depending on the model.

Newer vacuums are powered with lithium ion batteries, and the older versions feature rechargeable nickel–metal hydride (NiMh) batteries.

Models 

Neato's nineteen different models of robotic vacuums are grouped into three groups: the XV series, Botvac, and Botvac Connected. 

The XV series is Neato's older models, with different model numbers for different colors.  There are six versions: the original XV-11 (green), the XV-12 (white, XV-15 in Europe), XV-18 (black, aka. XV Signature), and XV-21 (purple, XV-25 in Europe).

The company's Botvac line features eight models with a white finish and different color accents depending on the model. The original Botvac models were 70e, 75, 80 and 85, and the Botvac 65 designed for Costco. The newer Botvac D series is more powerful, and includes a spiral blade brush. The models are D75, D80, and D85.

The company's newest line is the Botvac Connected series, which includes Wi-Fi connectivity, a phone app and Lithium ion batteries.  The models are the D3, D4, D5, D6, D7, D8, D9, and D10.

Corporate management 
Reiner Strecker (Managing Partner)

Advisory board for the managing partners:
Rainer Baule (Chairman)
Dr. Jörg Mittelsten Scheid 
Prof. Dr. Ing. Pius Baschera
Dr. Rainer Hillebrand
Dr. Axel Epe
Daniel Klüser
Dr. Timm Mittelsten Scheid
Sabine Schmidt

Key figures 
In 2011, Vorwerk Group reported revenue of €2.367 billion. Direct sales were the main drivers with an increase in revenue worldwide of 5 percent. The share of business volume outside of Germany was 67 percent and direct sales accounted for as much as 83 percent.

Products 
The most tradition-steeped products in the range are carpets and carpeting, the only business field in which Vorwerk has been active consistently since its founding in 1883. But Vorwerk is known chiefly for the production and sales of vacuum cleaners and accessories, and Division Kobold is the company’s biggest moneymaker today. Vorwerk Fitted Kitchens, the Thermomix kitchen appliance and the Feelina ironing system round out the portfolio in the household realm. New since the takeover of Jafra in 2004 are skin and body care products as well as cosmetics and perfume.

Sources 
Vorwerk Annual Reports 2000 - 2011
Vorwerk Press Releases

References

External links 
Company sites:
Vorwerk
Vorwerk Carpets
Vorwerk Facility Management Holding KG
akf group
Jafra Cosmetics
Lux Asia Pacific
Thermomix

Other sites:
 
Klinkenputzer und Staubfänger (Report in manager-magazin)  (German)
Die Vorwerker - Klopfen, Bürsten, Saugen - WDR-TV Report (German)

German brands
Vacuum cleaner manufacturers
Companies based in North Rhine-Westphalia
German companies established in 1883
Home appliance manufacturers of Germany
Manufacturing companies established in 1883